This is a list of seasons of Leksand-based Swedish ice hockey club Leksands IF.

References

Swedish ice hockey team seasons